Plum jerkum is an alcoholic drink produced from plums. It has been variously described as made in the same way as cider and as a fruit wine, although the terminology implies slightly different methods.

The drink is native to the north Cotswolds and particularly to the county of Worcestershire, where plum cultivation was once centred on Pershore and the Vale of Evesham; it was also found around Chipping Campden in Gloucestershire. Jerkum was known as a traditional product of Worcester along with potted lamperns and curd cheesecakes.
 
A 19th-century reference, again from Worcester, suggests that it was often taken mixed with cider to reduce its strength: "plum jerkum is [...] the fermented juice of plums, and is a very heady liquor. In the country they often mix it with cider, and thus moderate its effect [...] A man who was brought before the Pershore magistrates on a charge of drunkenness confessed he had a drop too much of it. Perhaps he took it neat".

The jerkum made around Chipping Campden was made, for preference, from a dark bullace-like plum found in the area's villages: however it ranged in colour from "a deep purple to a claret red", and in flavour "from a sticky sweetness to a sparkling tartness" depending on the type of plum used.

The Worcestershire author and farmer Fred Archer mentions jerkum several times in his stories of rural life, as does John Moore in his books set around a fictionalised Bredon Hill.

Some aficionados in American craft beverages have started to use "jerkum" as a broader term encompassing the alcoholic drink produced from any unadulterated fermented stone fruit (e.g., nectarine, peach, apricot, pluot).

References

Plum dishes
Fruit wines
English cuisine
Culture in Worcestershire
Culture in Warwickshire
Cotswolds